Natone is a locality and small rural community in the local government area of Burnie in the North West region of Tasmania.
The 2016 census determined a population of 281 for the state suburb of Natone.

History
The locality name is an Aboriginal word meaning “peak”. It was gazetted in 1966.

Geography
The Blythe River forms the eastern boundary.

Road infrastructure
The C102 route (Natone Road / Upper Natone Road) passes through from north to south-west. Route C114 (Lottah Road) starts at an intersection with C102 and runs south-west before exiting. Route C116 (Camena Road) starts at an intersection with C102 and runs south-east before exiting.

References

Burnie, Tasmania
Towns in Tasmania